Elections were held in the Australian state of Queensland between 18 June 1867 and 19 July 1867 to elect the members of the state's Legislative Assembly.

Key dates
Due to problems of distance and communications, it was not possible to hold the elections on a single day.

See also
 Members of the Queensland Legislative Assembly, 1867–1868

References

Elections in Queensland
1867 elections in Australia
1860s in Queensland
June 1867 events
July 1867 events